Saša Božičič (born 8 May 1983) is a Slovenian footballer. He currently plays for A.Š.D. Vesna.

References

1983 births
Living people
Slovenian footballers
Slovenian expatriate footballers
Association football midfielders
Slovenian PrvaLiga players
NK Maribor players
NK Primorje players
NK Krka players
FC Koper players
Expatriate footballers in Italy
People from Izola